SS Al-Abbas was the first major ship to be built at the Karachi Shipyard in Pakistan in 1967.

History
SS Al-Abbas was built for Muhammadi Steamship Company Limited in 1967. She was a cargo vessel plying between Karachi and Chittagong.

She was blown up and sunk on August 16, 1971, during Operation Jackpot in the Bangladesh Liberation War. She was berthed at Jetty No. 6 of the Port of Chittagong when Indian-trained commandoes of the Bangladeshi guerrilla force, Mukti Bahini, used limpet mines to blow her up.

Specifications
 Registry: 18 January 1968
 Gross tonnage: 6,087
 DWT tonnage: 12,860
 LOA: 486 feet

References

Ships built in Pakistan
1967 ships
Economy of Karachi